Perochirus scutellatus, also known as the shielded tropical gecko or atoll giant gecko, is a species of lizard in the family Gekkonidae. It is endemic to Micronesia.

References

Perochirus
Reptiles described in 1882